The 1945 Copa de Competencia Británica Final was the match that decided the winner of the 2nd edition of this Argentine domestic cup. The game was played on October 12, 1945. Racing defeated Boca Juniors 4–1 at San Lorenzo Stadium, winning their first Copa Británica trophy.

Qualified teams

Overview 
The cup was contested by clubs participating in 1945 Argentine Primera División, playing a single-elimination format in neutral venues. Racing beat Huracán (5–3 at San Lorenzo), River Plate (3–2 at La Bombonera), and Estudiantes de La Plata (4–0 at San Lorenzo) to advance to the final.

Boca Juniors beat Atlanta 6–2 at Ferro C. Oeste, qualifying to the quarter finals. After beating Independiente (1–0 at San Lorenzo) and thrashing Ferro Carril Oeste (7–0 at Estadio Racing Club), Boca earned a place in the final.

In the final, Racing went on to score 2 times in the first half, then 2 more times in the second half to beat Boca Juniors 4–1, with the only Boca Juniors goal coming from Mariano Sánchez in the 30th minute. Some Boca Juniors supporters went on to complain that referee Dottori did not award a penalty shot to Boca Juniors.

Match details

References

b
b
1945 in Argentine football
Football in Buenos Aires